Cryptopus may refer to:
 Cryptopus (plant), a genus of plants in the family Orchidaceae
 Cryptopus, a genus of turtles in the family Trionychidae, synonym of Cyclanorbis